Mujahedeen Secrets (transliterated Arabic: Asrar al-Mujahedeen) is an encryption program for Microsoft Windows. It was publicly offered to supporters of Al-Qaeda as a tool to protect the confidentiality of their electronic messages.
 The authors of the software are anonymous.

Uses
The software allows users to encrypt and decrypt text messages and files with a range of encryption techniques. This is primarily to ensure that any parties intercepting the messages during transmission, such as via Internet e-mail or cellphone, cannot easily view the message's contents.

Software releases
First release: In 2007, the Global Islamic Media Front, the propaganda arm of Al Qaeda and other Islamic terrorist groups, announced the release of the Mujahedeen Secrets software.
Second release: In 2008, an updated version, Mujahideen Secrets 2, was released, offering further encryption methods.

References

Cryptographic software
Al-Qaeda
2007 software